Tibetan numerals is the numeral system of the Tibetan script and a variety of the Hindu–Arabic numeral system. It is used in the Tibetan language and has a base-10 counting system. The Mongolian numerals were also developed from the Tibetan numerals.

Cardinal numbers

Extended numbers

Ordinals

Fractions

Several slashed forms of tibetan numerals are included in Unicode to represent fractions. However, their exact meaning and authenticity are unclear.

See also
Tibetan script

References

External links
Mazaudon & Lacito, 2002, "Les principes de construction du nombre dans les langues tibeto-birmanes", in François, ed. La Pluralité

Tibetan script
Numerals